General Charles Cadogan, 2nd Baron Cadogan (1684/5 – 24 September 1776) was an Anglo-Irish peer, soldier and Whig politician.

Early life
Cadogan was the younger son of Henry Cadogan of Liscarton, County Meath, and his wife, the former Bridget Waller, second daughter of the regicide Sir Hardress Waller. In 1726, he inherited his title on the death without male issue of his elder brother William Cadogan, 1st Earl Cadogan, whose titles, other than 1st Baron Cadogan, became extinct.

Career
He joined the Army, serving during the War of the Spanish Succession where he saw action at the Battles of Oudenarde and Malplaquet. His career benefited from his brother's close connection to the Army's Captain General the Duke of Marlborough. He rose, by 1715, to the rank of Lieutenant-Colonel in the Coldstream Guards. He was promoted Brigadier-General in 1735, Major-General in 1739, Lieutenant-General in 1745 and full General in 1761. Atterbury describes Cadogan as "a bold, bad, boistrous, blustering, bloody, booby.".

He was given the Colonelcy of the 4th Foot in 1719, transferring in 1734 to be Colonel of the 6th Dragoons until 1742, when he transferred a second time to be Colonel of the 2nd Troop of Horse Guards, a position he then held until his death.

Later, he served as Governor of Sheerness between 1749 and 1752 and Governor of Gravesend and Tilbury Fort from 1752 until his death in 1776.

Political career
After being defeated in his election to become a Member of Parliament for Reading in 1715, he was returned as a Whig in a by-election in 1716. He acted in Parliament with his brother in support of Sunderland against Walpole and represented Reading until the 1722 election when he was beaten by Tories at Reading. However, was successful at a by-election at Newport, Isle of Wight (his brother being then governor of the Isle of Wight).

Upon his brother's death in 1726, he succeeded to his barony of Cadogan of Oakley, under special remainder, but not to the earldom, and gave up his seat in the House of Commons.

Personal life
On 25 July 1717, Cadogan was married to the heiress Elizabeth Sloane at the Church of St George the Martyr, Queen Square, London. Elizabeth was a daughter of Sir Hans Sloane, 1st Baronet, and the former Elizabeth Langley Rose. Together, they had one son:

 Charles Sloane Cadogan, 1st Earl Cadogan (1728–1807), who married Frances Bromley, a daughter of Henry Bromley, 1st Baron Montfort. After her death, he married Mary Churchill, a daughter of Col. Charles Churchill and Lady Mary Walpole (a daughter of former Prime Minister Robert Walpole). They divorced in 1796.

Through his marriage to Elizabeth, the  Sloane estate in suburban Chelsea was transferred to the Cadogan family in 1753, which has been the basis of the family wealth ever since. Cadogan became Lord of the Manor of Chelsea.

Lady Cadogan died on 20 May 1768. At his death on 24 September 1776, he was the senior general in the British Army.

References
Notes

Sources

External links
Charles Cadogan, 2nd Baron Cadogan at The British Museum

|-

|-

|-

|-

|-

1685 births
1776 deaths
Irish soldiers
People from Caversham, Reading
6th (Inniskilling) Dragoons officers
Barons Cadogan
Whig (British political party) MPs for English constituencies
Fellows of the Royal Society
British MPs 1715–1722
British MPs 1722–1727
British Army generals
Members of the Parliament of Great Britain for Reading
Members of Parliament for Newport (Isle of Wight)
Coldstream Guards officers